Kirby and the Rainbow Curse, known in PAL regions as Kirby and the Rainbow Paintbrush, is a platforming video game in the Kirby series, developed by HAL Laboratory and published by Nintendo for Wii U. The title, which is a follow-up game of the 2005 Nintendo DS title Kirby: Canvas Curse, was released by Nintendo on January 22, 2015, in Japan, February 20, 2015, in North America, May 8, 2015, in Europe, and May 9, 2015, in Australia. The game supports the Kirby, Meta Knight, and King Dedede Amiibo.

Gameplay

Kirby and the Rainbow Curse carries on the style of gameplay from Canvas Curse, presenting the game with a unique modelling clay look. Players use the Wii U GamePad to help Kirby, who is stuck in a ball form, move across the level by drawing rainbow colored lines on the touchscreen to guide him. Making Kirby go through loops will speed him up, while touching him will put him into a spinning attack to use against enemies. For every 100 stars Kirby collects, Kirby can perform a Star Dash which increases his size, allowing him to charge through normally-indestructible blocks. Similarly to Kirby's Epic Yarn, Kirby can gain various forms throughout the game, such as a submarine, a rocket, and a tank. These forms help him progress through the game and provide certain elements that alters the gameplay. Up to three additional players using Wii Remotes can play as Bandana Waddle Dees, who can assist Kirby by carrying him around and attacking enemies and can also perform charged attacks. During these levels, an evil hand may try to capture Kirby, with only the Bandana Waddle Dees able to damage it. Each level contains several hidden treasure chests, some of which requires solving a puzzle or clearing a timed room, which unlock viewable clay figures and music tracks, as well as diary pages detailing Elline's journey. The main story mode in Kirby and the Rainbow Curse has 28 levels, while challenge mode has over 40.

The game features amiibo support with the Kirby, King Dedede, and Meta Knight figures from the Super Smash Bros. series of amiibo. The Kirby figure allows Kirby to activate the "Star Dash" ability at any time, the King Dedede figure gives Kirby extra hitpoints, and the Meta Knight figure gives him greater attack power during his touch-activated spinning attack.

Plot
One day in Dream Land, as Kirby and Bandana Waddle Dee are playing together, a mysterious hole opens in the sky, draining all the color from Dream Land and stopping everything and everyone in its tracks. Elline, a paintbrush fairy from the land of Seventopia, goes through the portal in order to escape several "grab hands" and uses her powers to bring color back to Kirby and Bandana Waddle Dee. She reveals that her best friend, Claycia, suddenly became evil and has used the colors from Kirby's planet, Popstar, in order to create seven worlds. Wanting to stop Claycia and restore Planet Popstar's color, Kirby, Bandana Waddle Dee, and Elline set off to Seventopia, Elline painting magical rainbow rope. Kirby is stuck in a ball form similar to Kirby: Canvas Curse. On the last world's final boss stage, it is revealed that Claycia had been possessed by an evil force known as the Dark Crafter, who has the urge to drain all of the color in a specific place. After Kirby pursues the Dark Crafter and manages to defeat it, he, Bandana Waddle Dee, Claycia, and Elline all return to Dream Land and bring back all of the missing color into Planet Popstar. The ending scene includes Claycia and Elline making a bushel of apples for Kirby to eat.

Development

When they first saw the Wii U GamePad, the developers realized they could incorporate asymmetric multiplayer into the new Kirby game and decided that, while Wii Remote players would have a more traditional running-and-jumping platformer experience, the GamePad player would draw "footholds". They decided to use the same line-drawing gameplay from Kirby: Canvas Curse. The Wii U game's polymer clay art style was chosen to create a more three-dimensional version of the DS game's painterly style, while the framerate of the animations was kept low so the game would look like it was made in claymation. Waddle Dees were chosen as the multiplayer characters because the developers felt that Meta Knight or King Dedede were not as well-suited to protect Kirby.

Reception

Kirby and the Rainbow Curse received mixed to positive reviews. It received an aggregated score of 75% on GameRankings based on 50 reviews and 73/100 on Metacritic based on 72 reviews.

Japanese gaming magazine Famitsu awarded Kirby and the Rainbow Curse a 34 out of 40, with one reviewer stating "Although guiding a character by drawing lines with the GamePad isn't a new mechanism in itself, the game deserves applause for making that mechanism more interesting to play. The visuals are cute and look like clay animation. The game is filled with a surprisingly diverse load of gimmicks so it excites in many ways. The game is packed with the true charm of action games."

Giant Bomb's Dan Ryckert gave Kirby and the Rainbow Curse two stars out of five, comparing the title negatively to its DS predecessor. He felt that the levels were too simple and linear, with collectibles too easy to reach. He disliked that Kirby could not steal enemies' abilities like in Canvas Curse, and thought that the vehicles Kirby could turn into made certain levels "even more stripped-down." While he found the controls functional, the repetitive boss fights were frustrating due to the stylus' lack of precision. Ryckert preferred to play as a Waddle Dee, whose traditional control scheme afforded more reliable platforming and boss fighting than the "unreliable stylus paths" provided. However, Ryckert did find the clay-based art style "gorgeous."

IGN's Marty Sliva found the game much more enjoyable, awarding it 8.0 out of 10. He appreciated the game's occasional difficulty and its variety, finding the vehicular stages enjoyable and the various world themes beautiful. Sliva thought that the visuals were "absolutely gorgeous," praising details like fingerprints in the clay and the stop-motion movements of the bosses, but was disappointed that he had to focus on the GamePad instead of an HDTV. He found that Waddle Dee multiplayer did not "add a whole lot to the experience," but it was "a nice experiment to test out."

Nintendo Life's Jon Walgren gave Rainbow Curse seven stars out of ten. He found the game "charming" and its visuals to be "the prettiest [...] on Wii U so far," but was disappointed that the clay aesthetic did not influence the gameplay like the fabric did in Kirby's Epic Yarn. He thought the main campaign was easy, but the Challenge Mode and the search for collectibles provided a bit more difficulty. Like other reviewers, Walgren would have liked to see the game in high definition but found he had to focus on the GamePad's low-definition screen. Playing with others was "pleasant," but it was not the best local multiplayer experience on Wii U.

Hardcore Gamer's Dermot Creegan gave the game a 4.5 out of 5, calling it a "constantly creative adventure that offers players something they won't find anywhere else." He praised the claymation aesthetic calling them "astoundingly beautiful," while also complimenting the number of collectibles and challenges.

Sales 
Nearly one month after its release in Japan, Kirby and the Rainbow Curse had sold roughly 58,000 units, with 83,000 copies sold by the end of June 2015.

Notes

References

External links
 

2015 video games
Asymmetrical multiplayer video games
Clay animation video games
HAL Laboratory games
Kirby (series) platform games
Multiplayer and single-player video games
Video games about curses
Video games about magic
Video games developed in Japan
Video games produced by Kensuke Tanabe
Video games scored by Shogo Sakai
Video games that use Amiibo figurines
Wii U eShop games
Wii U games
Wii U-only games